I Love Paraisópolis (stylized as I ♥ Paraisópolis; ; or simply Paraisópolis) is a Brazilian access prime telenovela created and written by Alcides Nogueira & Mário Teixeira and directed by Wolf Maya, premiered on May 11, 2015 on TV Globo at 7:35 p.m. / 8:10 p.m. (BRT/AMT).

Bruna Marquezine, Tatá Werneck, Caio Castro, Letícia Spiller, Maria Casadevall, Alexandre Borges, Soraya Ravenle, Caroline Abras, Danton Mello, Fabíula Nascimento, Lucy Ramos, Carolina Oliveira, Dalton Vigh, Nicette Bruno, Henri Castelli and Maurício Destri are in the lead roles.

Plot 
Marizete (Mari) and Pandora (Danda) are not blood sisters and dwellers of the community of Paraisópolis, that dream of a better life. Eva and Jurandir (Juju), biological parents of Danda, adopted Mari after her mother, Eva's really good friend, died during childbirth. Mari and Danda grew up together and beyond the relationship as sisters, they developed a great friendship.

Mari dedicates to focus on her studies and work really hard with the dream of giving her own mother a home of her own. Danda, very attractive and vain, has more modest goals, working only to support her vanity, but very dedicated to her sister, her best friend.

A few meters from the community is the luxurious neighborhood of Morumbi, separated only by a street, where an architect named Benjamin lives. This one has a particular project, to redevelop Paraisópolis, the project is criticized by its Benjamin's mother (Soraya) and his stepfather (Gabo). Soraya disapproves of the son's relationship with the residents of the community. The couple holds a majority stake in the construction company Pilartex and sees the Paraisopolis area as a business opportunity, for real estate investment. The plot takes an unexpected turn after Benjamin, Margot's fiancé, meets Mari and falls in love with her.

Cast

Impact

Ratings

Notes

References

External links 
 
 

2015 telenovelas
TV Globo telenovelas
Brazilian telenovelas
2015 Brazilian television series debuts
2015 Brazilian television series endings
Brazilian LGBT-related television shows
Gay-related television shows
Television shows set in São Paulo
Television shows set in New York City
Portuguese-language telenovelas
Cultural depictions of the Mafia
Italian-American culture
Works about the American Mafia
Works about organized crime in Brazil